Wenceslas Square (Czech:  , colloquially Václavák ) is one of the main city squares and the centre of the business and cultural communities in the New Town of Prague, Czech Republic. Many historical events occurred there, and it is a traditional setting for demonstrations, celebrations, and other public gatherings. It is also the place with the busiest pedestrian traffic in the whole country. The square is named after Saint Wenceslas, the patron saint of Bohemia. It is part of the historic centre of Prague, a World Heritage Site.

Formerly known as Koňský trh (Horse Market), for its periodic accommodation of horse markets during the Middle Ages, it was renamed Svatováclavské náměstí (English: Saint Wenceslas square) in 1848 on the proposal of Karel Havlíček Borovský.

Features

Less a square than a boulevard, Wenceslas Square has the shape of a very long (750 m, total area 45,000 m2) rectangle, in a northwest–southeast direction. The street slopes upward to the southeast side. At that end, the street is dominated by the grand neoclassical Czech National Museum. The northwest end runs up against the border between the New Town and the Old Town.

History
In 1348, Bohemian King Charles IV founded the New Town of Prague. The plan included several open areas for markets, of which the second largest was the Koňský trh, or Horse Market (the largest was the Charles Square). At the southeastern end of the market was the Horse Gate, one of the gates in the walls of the New Town.

The Statue of Saint Wenceslas formerly stood in the middle of Wenceslas Square, near Grandhotel Evropa, it was moved to Vyšehrad in 1879. During the Czech National Revival movement in the Czech lands of Austria-Hungary in the 19th century, a more noble name for the street was requested. At this time the square was renamed and new Statue of Saint Wenceslas was built in 1912.

On 28 October 1918, Alois Jirásek read the Czechoslovak declaration of independence in front of the Saint Wenceslas statue.

During the 1938 May Crisis, the square was the site of massive demonstrations against Nazi Germany's demands for the Sudetenland and the appeasement policies of the First Czechoslovak Republic's allies the United Kingdom and France. Under the Protectorate of Bohemia and Moravia, the Nazi occupation force used the street for mass demonstrations. During the Prague Uprising in 1945, a few buildings near the National Museum were destroyed. They were later replaced by department stores.

On 16 January 1969, student Jan Palach set himself on fire in Wenceslas Square to protest the Warsaw Pact invasion of Czechoslovakia in 1968.

On 28 March 1969, the Czechoslovak national ice hockey team defeated the USSR team for the second time in that year's Ice Hockey World Championships. As the Czechoslovak Socialist Republic was still under Soviet occupation, the victory induced great celebrations. An estimated 150,000 people gathered on Wenceslas Square, and skirmishes with police developed. A group of provocateurs then attacked the Prague office of the Soviet airline Aeroflot, located on the street. The vandalism served as a pretext for reprisals and the period of so-called normalization.

In 1989, during the Velvet Revolution, large demonstrations (with hundreds of thousands of people or more) were held here.

Wenceslas Square is lined by hotels, offices, retail stores, currency exchange booths and fast-food joints. Many strip clubs also operate around Wenceslas Square. Wenceslas Square is also a popular place to spend the New Year's celebrations, another popular option are terraces near the river. The Christmas markets (Vánoční trhy) are held here every year from early December to the first week of January.

Reconstruction
A reconstruction of the Wenceslas Square has been underway since 2020. The lower part is expected to be completed in spring of 2022. The upper part (from Vodičkova street) is expected to be completed in 2023. It should result in uniformed paving, wider sidewalks, bicycle paths and new alleys. Also, tram traffic will return to the upper part of the square.

Art and architecture

The two obvious landmarks of Wenceslas Square are at the southeast, uphill end: the 1885–1891 National Museum Building, designed by Czech architect Josef Schulz, and the statue of Wenceslas.

Other significant buildings on the square include:
 Antonin Pfeiffer and Matěj Blecha's "Palác Koruna" office building and shopping center, #1–2, 1912–1914, with architectural sculpture by Vojtěch Sucharda
 Ludvík Kysela's "Lindt Building", No. 4, an early work of architectural constructivism
 the BAŤA shoe store, No. 6, 1929
 Matěj Blecha and Emil Králíček's "Adam Pharmacy", No. 8, 1911–1913
 Jan Kotěra's "Peterka Building", No. 12, 1899–1900
 Pavel Janák's "Hotel Juliš", No. 22, 1926
 Alois Dryák's "Hotel Evropa", #25–27, 1872, 1905 redesign, with architectural sculptor Ladislav Šaloun
 Antonin Wiehl's "Wiehl House", No. 34, 1896
 the "Melantrich Building", No. 36, 1914, where Alexander Dubček and Václav Havel appeared together on its balcony in November 1989, a major event of the Velvet Revolution
 "Hotel Adria", No 26, reconstruction in 1912, in 1918 sold to František Tichý, Burian's Theatre (1925–1928)

Transport
The Prague Metro's line A runs underneath Wenceslas Square, and the Metro's two busiest stations, Muzeum (lines A and C) and Můstek (lines A and B), have entrances on the street. Currently trams only cut across the square. Tram tracks running the length of the square were removed in 1980; a proposal to reintroduce the tram line has been approved, with construction scheduled to begin in 2023. Most of the street is open to automobile traffic, but the northwestern end has been pedestrianised since 2012.

Literary references

 A tavern in the square, the Golden Goose, is mentioned in Franz Kafka's Amerika, as the place where the Manageress previously worked.
 Wenceslas Square is the name of a theatrical play by Larry Shue, which is set in Prague.
 Wenceslas Square is the name of a story written by Arthur Phillips, which takes place in the Czechoslovak Socialist Republic at the end of the Cold War. The story was published in the compendium Wild East: Stories from the Last Frontier, and featured in episode 337 of the WBEZ radio show This American Life.
 "Wenceslas Square" featured in Marc Adnitt's short film "You Want Christmas?" in December 2008.

References

 Lazarova, Daniela (27 November 2004). The Changing Face of Wenceslas Square Radio Praha.
 Stankova, Jaroslava, et al. (1992) Prague: Eleven Centuries of Architecture. Prague: PAV. .

External links

 Wenceslas Square in Prague
 

Squares in Prague
Wenceslaus I, Duke of Bohemia